Harriet Kemsley (born 21 June 1987) is an English stand-up comedian.

Early life

Kemsley grew up in Canterbury, Kent.  She studied English literature at Kingston University.

Career

Kemsley began stand-up in 2011 and within months won the Funny's Funny contest. In 2012, she won Bath Comedy Festival New Act of the Year and Brighton Comedy Festival New Act of the Year and was named by Rhod Gilbert as one of the Ten Must See Comics of 2012. Her autobiographical solo show, Slutty Joan, was reviewed positively in The Guardian.

She hosts a podcast, Why Is Harriet Crying?, with fellow comedian Sunil Patel.

Kemsley has appeared on Sam Delaney's News Thing, Roast Battle, 8 Out of 10 Cats Does Countdown and 8 Out of 10 Cats. She and then-fiancé Bobby Mair appeared on a Viceland reality show in 2017, entitled Bobby & Harriet Get Married, featuring their wedding, officiated by comedian Romesh Ranganathan.

As an actress, she has appeared in the film Bonobo and on TV on Damned and Doctor Foster. She also provided the voice of Nashandra, the final boss of the video game Dark Souls II.

Personal life

Kemsley is married to fellow comedian Bobby Mair. She has dyspraxia and is a vegan.

References

External links

1987 births
Living people
21st-century English comedians
English women comedians
People from Canterbury
Patreon creators